is a former Japanese football player.

Playing career
Uemura was born in Yamanashi Prefecture on December 1, 1975. After graduating from Kanagawa University, he joined newly was promoted to J2 League club, Ventforet Kofu in 1999. On November 14, he debuted as substitute from the 78th minute against Kawasaki Frontale. However he could only play this match and retired end of 1999 season.

Club statistics

References

External links

1975 births
Living people
Kanagawa University alumni
Association football people from Yamanashi Prefecture
Japanese footballers
J2 League players
Ventforet Kofu players
Association football midfielders